Nathaniel Bishop (? – 30 June 1723) was a Hudson's Bay Company employee who became master of Fort Prince of Wales.

References 
 

Hudson's Bay Company people
1723 deaths
Year of birth unknown